Doris de Agostini-Rossetti (28 April 1958 – 22 November 2020) was a Swiss alpine skier, bronze-medalist in the Alpine World Ski Championships 1978 and winner of the 1982/1983 Downhill World Cup. She also competed at the 1976 Winter Olympics and the 1980 Winter Olympics.

World Cup victories

References

External links
 
 

1958 births
2020 deaths
Swiss female alpine skiers
Olympic alpine skiers of Switzerland
Alpine skiers at the 1976 Winter Olympics
Alpine skiers at the 1980 Winter Olympics
FIS Alpine Ski World Cup champions
20th-century Swiss women